Evans Paul (born 25 November 1955), also known as Compère Plume; shortened as K-Plume (KP), is a Haitian politician and former president of the Democratic United Committee. He was elected mayor of Port-au-Prince in the 1990 elections that brought Jean-Bertrand Aristide's National Front for Change and Democracy party to power. He made an unsuccessful run for President of Haiti in the 2006 elections under the Democratic Alliance Party banner. He was leader of the Convergence Démocratique prior to the 2004 Haitian coup d'état which overthrew Aristide. On December 25, 2014, President Michel Martelly announced Evans Paul as Haiti's new prime minister. On February 2, 2016, he resigned. He remained in his position due to an agreement signed on 6 February, until a prime minister could be reached by consensus and an interim president could be elected by Parliament for a 120-day term.

He used to host the program "Plume" on Radio Caraïbes from 1974 to 1976, from where he got his nickname.

References

Presidents of Haiti
Prime Ministers of Haiti
1955 births
Living people
Democratic Alliance Party (Haiti) politicians
Mayors of Port-au-Prince
21st-century Haitian politicians